Anisoplaca is a genus of moth in the family Gelechiidae.

Species
 Anisoplaca achyrota (Meyrick, 1885)
 Anisoplaca acrodactyla (Meyrick, 1907)
 Anisoplaca bathropis (Meyrick, 1904)
 Anisoplaca cosmia Bradley, 1956
 Anisoplaca fraxinea Philpott, 1928
 Anisoplaca ptyoptera Meyrick, 1885
 Anisoplaca viatrix Meyrick, 1921

References

 
Pexicopiini
Taxa named by Edward Meyrick
Moth genera